The Mainfranken-Tour was a cycling race held annually in Germany. It was part of UCI Europe Tour in category 2.2U.

Winners

Mainfranken-Tour

Internationale Ernst-Sachs-Tour

Internationales Ernst-Sachs-Gedächtnis-Rennen

Rund um Spessart und Rhön

References

Cycle races in Germany
UCI Europe Tour races
Recurring sporting events established in 1909
Recurring sporting events disestablished in 2010
1909 establishments in Germany
2010 disestablishments in Germany
Defunct cycling races in Germany